The 2015 Fusagasugá City Council election was held on Sunday, 25 October 2015, to elect the fourth City Council since the 2002 reform (Legislative Act 2002). At stake were all 17 seats in the City Council. There are twenty polling stations authorized by the Registradury.

Results

Polling vote

References 

2015
Regional elections